David Stoyanov (born 13 March 1991)  is a Bulgarian footballer currently playing for CSKA 1948 as a defender.

References

External links
 

Bulgarian footballers
1991 births
Living people
First Professional Football League (Bulgaria) players
PFC Minyor Pernik players
FC Bansko players
OFC Pirin Blagoevgrad players
Association football defenders
People from Pernik